USS Ella has been the name of more than one United States Navy ship, and may refer to:

 , a steamer in commission from 1862 to 1865
 , a patrol boat briefly under U.S. Navy control during 1917.

See also
 , a steamer commissioned in April 1864 and destroyed in August 1864, was formerly the Confederate States of America blockade runner Ella.

United States Navy ship names